Pedro Morales (1942−2019) was a Puerto Rican professional wrestler.

Pedro Morales may also refer to:
Pedro Morales Torres (1932–2000) was a Chilean football manager
Pedro Morales (footballer) (born 1985), Chilean football player
Pedro Saúl Morales (1959–2021), racing cyclist

See also
Pedro de Morales (1538−1614), religious writer
Pedro Morales y Mercado, Spanish emigrant, mayor of Buenos Aires